Střelice is a municipality and village in Brno-Country District in the South Moravian Region of the Czech Republic. It has about 3,100 inhabitants.

Twin towns – sister cities

Střelice is twinned with:
 Assago, Italy
 Nozay, France

References

Villages in Brno-Country District